The 2006 Crawley Borough Council election took place on 4 May 2006 to elect members of Crawley Borough Council in West Sussex, England. One third of the council was up for election. The Conservative gained overall control of the council from the Labour Party, albeit with a majority of just one seat.

After the election, the composition of the council was:
Conservative 19
Labour 16
Liberal Democrats 2

Ward results

Bewbush

Broadfield North

 The Conservative candidate won on a drawing of lots.

Broadfield South

Furnace Green

Ifield

Langley Green

Maidenbower

Northgate

Pound Hill North

Pound Hill South and Worth

Southgate

West Green

References

2006 English local elections
2006
2000s in West Sussex